The 2019–20 South Dakota Coyotes men's basketball team represented the University of South Dakota during the 2019–20 NCAA Division I men's basketball season. The Coyotes, led by second-year head coach Todd Lee, played their home games at the Sanford Coyote Sports Center in Vermillion, South Dakota as members of the Summit League. They finished the season 20–12, 10–6 in Summit League play to finish in third place. They lost in the quarterfinals of the Summit League tournament to North Dakota.

Previous season
The Coyotes finished the 2018–19 season 13–17, 7–9 in Summit League play to finish in sixth place. They would lose to Purdue Fort Wayne in the first round of the Summit League.

Roster

Schedule and results

|-
!colspan=9 style=| Exhibition

|-
!colspan=9 style=| Regular season

|-
!colspan=9 style=| Summit League tournament

Source

References

South Dakota Coyotes men's basketball seasons
South Dakota
Coyo
Coyo